Willian Arthur Crass (June 9, 1911 – May 25, 1996) was an American football player who played as a fullback in the National Football League (NFL) for the Chicago Cardinals for one season, in 1937. He appeared in three games for the Cardinals and had five rushing attempts for eight yards in his career. He played college football at Louisiana State University for the LSU Tigers. At LSU, he was a first-team All-Southeastern Conference selection by the Associated Press in 1935 and a second-team selection by United Press International in 1936.

References

LSU Tigers football players
American football fullbacks
1911 births
1996 deaths
Chicago Cardinals players
People from Childress, Texas